Microhematuria, also called microscopic hematuria (both usually abbreviated as MH), is a medical condition in which urine contains small amounts of blood; the blood quantity is too low to change the color of the urine (otherwise, it is known as gross hematuria). While not dangerous in itself, it may be a symptom of kidney disease, such as IgA nephropathy or Sickle cell trait, which should be monitored by a doctor.

The American Urological Association (AUA) recommends a definition of microscopic hematuria as three or more red blood cells per high-power microscopic field in urinary sediment from two of three properly collected urinalysis specimens.

Microhematuria is usually asymptomatic, and as of 2001 there were medical guidelines on how to handle asymptomatic microhematuria (AMH) so as to avoid problems such as overtreatment or misdiagnosis.
In 2020 American Urological Association guidelines were updated.

See also

 Proteinuria
 Hematuria
 Myoglobinuria
 Hemoglobinuria

References

External links
 
2012 AUA Guidelines 

Abnormal clinical and laboratory findings for urine